Everything's O.K. is an EP by the American punk rock band the Queers, released in May 1998 by Hopeless Records.

Track listing
 "Everything's O.K." (from the album Punk Rock Confidential)
 "Queerbait"
 "Get a Life and Live It Loser"
 "I Enjoy Being a Boy"

Personnel
Joe Queer – guitar, vocals
Geoff Useless – bass, vocals
Rick Respectable – drums, vocals

References

1998 EPs
The Queers albums
Hopeless Records EPs